The köçek  (plural  in Turkish) was typically a very handsome young male slave or a Romani dancer (rakkas), who usually cross-dressed in feminine attire, and was employed as an entertainer.

Roots 

The Turkish küçük derives from the Persian word  kuchak, from Middle Persian (kwck' /kūčak/, “small”), from Proto-Iranian *kaw-ča-ka, from Proto-Indo-Iranian *kaw- ~ *ku- (“young, small”).In the Crimean Tatar language, the word köçek means "baby camel". The culture of the köçek, which flourished from the 17th to the 19th century, had its origin in the customs in Ottoman palaces, and in particular in the harems. Its genres enriched both the music and the dance of the Ottomans.

The support of the Sultans was a key factor in its development, as the early stages of the art form was confined to palace circles. From there the practice dispersed throughout the Empire by means of independent troupes.

Culture 

A köçek would begin training around the age of seven or eight after he was circumcised and would be considered accomplished after about six years of study and practice. A dancer's career would last as long as he was clean shaven and retained his youthful appearance.

The dances, collectively known as köçek oyunu, blended elements from throughout the empire, most importantly Turkish (like Karsilamas and Kaşık Havası) and Arab elements. They performed to a particular genre of music known as köçekçe, which was performed in the form of suites in a given melody. It too was a mix of Sufi, Balkan and classical Anatolian influences, some of which survives in popular Turkish music today. The accompaniment included various percussion instruments, such as the davul-köçek, the davul being a large drum, one side covered with goat skin and the other in sheep skin, producing different tones. A köçeks skill would be judged not only on his dancing abilities but also on his proficiency with percussion instruments, especially a type of castagnette known as the çarpare.  The dancers were accompanied by an orchestra, featuring four to five each kaba kemençe and laouto as principal instruments, used exclusively for köçek suites. There were also two singers. A köçek dance in the Ottoman seraglio (palace harem) involved one or two dozen köçeks and many musicians. The occasions of their performances were wedding or circumcision celebrations, feasts and festivals, as well as the pleasure of the sultans and the aristocracy.

The youths, often wearing heavy makeup, would curl their hair and wear it in long tresses under a small black or red velvet hat decorated with coins, jewels and gold. Their usual garb consisted of a tiny red embroidered velvet jacket with a gold-embroidered silk shirt, shalvar (baggy trousers), a long skirt and a gilt belt, knotted at the back. They were said to be "sensuous, attractive, effeminate", and their dancing "sexually provocative". Dancers minced and gyrated their hips in slow vertical and horizontal figure eights, rhythmically snapping their fingers and making suggestive gestures. Often acrobatics, tumbling and mock wrestling were part of the act. 

Famous poets, such as Fazyl bin Tahir Enderuni, wrote poems, and classical composers, such as the court musician Hammamizade İsmail Dede Efendi (1778–1846), composed köçekçes for celebrated köçeks. Many Istanbul meyhanes (nighttime taverns serving meze, rakı or wine) hired köçeks. Before starting their performance, the köçek danced among the spectators, to make them more excited. In the audience, competition for their attention often caused commotions and altercations. Men would allegedly go wild, breaking their glasses, shouting themselves voiceless, or fighting and sometimes killing each other vying for the opportunity to rape, molest, or otherwise force the children into sexual servitude. This resulted in suppression of the practice under Sultan Abdulmejid I.

As of 1805, there were approximately 600 köçek dancers working in the taverns of the Turkish capital.  They were outlawed in 1837 due to fighting among audience members over the dancers.  With the suppression of harem culture under Sultan Abdulaziz (1861–1876) and Sultan Abdul Hamid II (1876–1908), köçek dance and music lost the support of its imperial patrons and gradually disappeared.

Köçeks were much more sought after than the çengi ("belly dancers"), their female counterparts. Some youths were known to have been killed by the çengi, who were extremely jealous of men's attention toward the boys.

Dance and music 
Köçek dancers ranged from ten to eighteen years old. Their attire consisted of wearing colorful garments, makeup, perfume and long hair. They were tasked with entertaining their superiors through dance, music, singing and performing acrobatics.

Aside from dancing, köçeks were required to play instruments simultaneously. They used dâire (Arabic for “circle”) which is similar to a drum, a çaǧana (Persian origin) that were metal castanets, and çelpara (Persian for “four pieces”), also known as çârpâra, clappers. Vocally, they used ince sâz (soft sounding instruments) consisting of kemençe rumî (fiddle) and lavta (lute).

Lyrics and poems were written about the köçek, describing their performances, mentioning their coquettish ways and charm. Derived from that, came the köçekçe, becoming a musical phenomena as they performed in ensembles.

Lifestyle 
Education was provided to the köçek at enderȗn mektebi (the school of the palace) and only some were chosen to live in the inner part of the sultan’s palace. Others resided elsewhere and worked in the kol (in the guilds of craftsmen). 

Köçeks were recruited of several background and ways, such as by captives, slaves or devşirme (recruiting of boys from the Janissary corps) from the fourteenth to early eighteenth century.  

They performed at varying sultan festivities, presented to ambassadors and showed their skills at taverns, wine cellars and coffee shops for money.

Modern offshoots 
A modern interpretation is the movie Köçek (1975) by director Nejat Saydam. The movie follows the life of Caniko, an androgynous Gypsy, who struggles with his gender identity.

See also
Bacha bazi, Afghan equivalent
Khawal, Egyptian equivalent
Ghilman
LGBT topics and Islam

Notes

References
AYVERDİ, Sâmiha; Istanbul Geceleri The nights of Istanbul, ed. Baha, Istanbul, 1977.
ENDERUNLU Fazıl bey; Çenginame''', 1759
Erdoğan, Sema Nilgün: Sexual life in Ottoman Empire, ed. Dönence, Istanbul, 1996. p. 88–92
JANSSEN, Thijs: Transvestites and Transsexuals in Turkey, in Sexuality and Eroticism Among Males in Moslem Societies, edited by Arno Schmidt and Jehoeda Sofer, ed. Harrington Park Press, New York, 1992
Klebe, Dorit. "Effeminate Professional Musicians in Sources of Ottoman-Turkish Court Poetry and Music of the Eighteenth and Nineteenth Centuries.” Music in Art 30, no. 1/2 (2005): 97–116.
KOÇU, Reşad Ekrem,  Eski İstanbul'da Meyhaneler ve Meyhane Köçekleri, İstanbul Ansiklopedisi Notları NoÖZTUNA, Yılmaz: Türk Musikisi Ansiklopedisi,  Milli Eğitim Basımevi, İstanbul, 1976. p. 23
S.M. ÜSEINOV: Rusça-Qırımtatarca, Qırımtatarca-Rusça luğat'', Aqmescit, Tezis, 2007.

External links

Turkish Cultural Foundation: Court dance in the Ottoman Empire
Köçek (Dancing Boy) – Homosexual Art of Turkey
A Question of Köçek – Men in Skirts

Turkish male dancers
Transgender in the Middle East
Middle Eastern culture
Arab culture
Belly dance
Gender systems
Turkish sex workers
18th century in LGBT history
19th century in LGBT history
Turkish words and phrases
Slaves from the Ottoman Empire
LGBT in Turkey
Cross-dressing
Transgender in Europe
Male erotic dancers
Islam and slavery
Sexual slavery